Imane Chebel (born 25 March 1995) is a Canadian-born Algerian international footballer who plays as a midfielder for Brest and the Algeria women's national football team. She competed for Algeria at the 2018 Africa Women Cup of Nations, playing in one match.

References

External links
 

1995 births
Living people
Algerian women's footballers
Algeria women's international footballers
Women's association football midfielders
Concordia University alumni
Canadian people of Algerian descent
Sportspeople of Algerian descent
Canadian women's soccer players
Francophone Quebec people
Soccer people from Quebec
Sportspeople from Quebec City
BIIK Kazygurt players